Sidney Kyffin Greenslade  (1867–1955), born in Exeter, was the first architect of the National Library of Wales, located in Aberystwyth. Whilst he was working on the building, he was approached by the Davies sisters of Gregynog to become curator of the University College of Wales's Arts and Craft Museum.

References

External links
 Sidney K. Greenslade Biography. University of Wales, Aberystwyth

1867 births
1955 deaths